Ross Wilburn (1964/1965) is an American politician and social worker serving as a member of the Iowa House of Representatives from the 50th district. Elected in November 2018, he assumed office in January 2019. Wilburn has also served as chair of the Iowa Democratic Party since January 2021.

Early life and education 
Wilburn was born in Galesburg, Illinois and raised in Ames, Iowa. After graduating from high school, Wilburn joined the Iowa Army National Guard. He earned a Bachelor of Social Work and Master of Social Work from the University of Iowa.

Career 
From 1997 to 2000, Wilburn was the graduate program director of the School of Social Work Quad Cities Center at the University of Iowa. From 2000 to 2007, he worked as the executive director of the Crisis Center of Johnson County. From 2008 to 2014, he served as the director of equity at the Iowa City Community School District. Wilburn was elected to the Iowa City Council in 2006 and served for 12 years, including for one term as mayor of Iowa City. Wilburn was a candidate for the 2018 Iowa gubernatorial election, placing last in the Democratic primary. He was later elected to the Iowa House of Representatives in November 2018 and assumed office in 2019. He serves as the ranking member of the House Veterans Affairs Committee. In January 2021, Wilburn became the chair of the Iowa Democratic Party.

References 

21st-century African-American politicians
21st-century American politicians
African-American state legislators in Iowa
Living people
Democratic Party members of the Iowa House of Representatives
Politicians from Ames, Iowa
People from Galesburg, Illinois
People from Iowa City, Iowa
State political party chairs of Iowa
University of Iowa alumni
Year of birth missing (living people)